The culture of Kosovo refers to the culture of Kosovo. It encompasses the ancient heritage, architecture, literature, visual arts, music, cinema, sports and cuisine of Kosovo. Because of its history and geography, it represents a blend of different cultural spheres especially of the western and eastern culture. 

The society of Kosovo has undergone considerable changes over the last centuries, one of the most notable being the increasing level of secularity. The national identity revolves more around the language and culture, than the religion. 

Due to Albanians making up the majority of Kosovo's population, the culture tends to be Albanian with slight variations.

See also 
 Cultural Heritage of Kosovo
Architecture of Kosovo
Literature of Kosovo
Culture of Kosovo Serbs
 Culture of Albania
 Culture of Serbia
 Culture of the Western Balkans (disambiguation)

Annotations

References